Deadwood, California may refer to:
 Deadwood, Placer County, California
 Deadwood, Sierra County, California
 Deadwood, Trinity County, California
 Deadwood, Tuolumne County, California